Smoke Lake is a lake in northwest Alberta within the Municipal District of Greenview No. 16.

Provincial recreation area 
The Smoke Lake Provincial Recreation Area is located on the northeast shore of Smoke Lake.

Camping 

Operated by the Town of Fox Creek, the recreation area includes a campground featuring 47 campsites and a day use site. Camping season begins on May 24 and ends on October 1.

Recreation 

Other recreational activities include canoeing/kayaking, cross-country skiing, fishing, ice fishing, power boating, snowmobiling (off-site), swimming, and water-skiing.

Fish species 
Fish species in Smoke Lake include burbot, Iowa darter, lake whitefish, longnose sucker, northern pike, spottail shiner, trout-perch, tullibee (cisco), walleye, white sucker, and yellow perch.

References

External links 
Atlas of the Lakes – Smoke Lake
Smoke Lake Provincial Recreation Area

Municipal District of Greenview No. 16
Smoke Lake